INTEGRITY and INTEGRITY-178B are real-time operating systems (RTOSes) produced and marketed by Green Hills Software.

INTEGRITY
INTEGRITY is POSIX-certified and intended for use in embedded systems of 32-bits or 64-bits. Supported computer architectures include variants of: ARM, Blackfin, ColdFire, MIPS, PowerPC, XScale, and x86. INTEGRITY is supported by popular SSL/TLS libraries such as wolfSSL.

INTEGRITY-178B
INTEGRITY-178B is the DO-178B–compliant version of INTEGRITY. It is used in several military jets such as the B-2, F-16, F-22, and F-35, and the commercial aircraft Airbus A380. Its kernel design guarantees bounded computing times by eliminating features such as dynamic memory allocation.

The auditing and security engineering abilities have allowed it to obtain the Evaluation Assurance Level (EAL) 6 rating by the National Security Agency (NSA). The Target of Evaluation (TOE) Architecture in the Security Target for the evaluation excludes components such as those for file system and networking, from the definition of the TOE, focusing almost solely on the core kernel. Other operating systems, such as Windows, macOS or Linux, though evaluated at lower levels of assurance, generally include these abilities within their TOE.

Supported processor architectures 
The INTEGRITY Architecture Support Package (ASP) provides support for many processor families:
 PowerPC/Power ISA
 AMD and Intel: x86
 ARM Holdings: ARM
 MIPS

References

External links

 INTEGRITY-178B

ARM operating systems
Embedded operating systems
Microkernel-based operating systems
Microkernels
MIPS operating systems
PowerPC operating systems
Proprietary operating systems
Real-time operating systems